The 2018 Wimbledon wheelchair tennis Quad Doubles final was an exhibition match that took place on July 14, 2018. Andrew Lapthorne and David Wagner defeated Dylan Alcott and Lucas Sithole, 6–2, 6–3.

On November 27, 2017, the All England Club announced that it would host a Quad Doubles exhibition match, for the first time, in 2018. Up to that time, the Quad division had not played at either Wimbledon or the French Open. Lapthorne and Wagner had long campaigned for the inclusion of the division in Wimbledon. In December 2018, the All England Club announced a Quad Singles draw and a Quad Doubles draw in 2019.

Seeds

Draw

References

Sources
 Main Draw

2018 Wimbledon Championships
Wimbledon Championships, 2018 Quad Doubles